Willie Allan (born 11 December 1942) is a Scottish former professional footballer.

References

1942 births
Living people
Scottish footballers
Association football inside forwards
Aberdeen F.C. players
St Mirren F.C. players
Falkirk F.C. players
Scottish Football League players
Scotland under-23 international footballers
Scottish expatriate footballers
Expatriate soccer players in South Africa
Scottish Football League representative players
Durban City F.C. players